Stage on Screen was a series broadcast on public television PBS affiliate Thirteen WNET New York, which presents American theatrical productions that consist of cinematic and made-for-TV adaptations, live broadcasts, and documentaries that relate to the process of staging theatrical performances.

It is not to be confused with Stage on Screen, the London-based company producing DVD versions of classic stage plays.

Episodes
The Man Who Came to Dinner
Anna Deavere Smith's Twilight: Los Angeles 1992
A. R. Gurney's Far East
Clare Boothe Luce's The Women
Tantalus: Behind the Mask (a documentary on John Barton's Tantalus)
Beckett on Film

External links
Stage on Screen Homepage.
Stage on Screen classic DVD Homepage.

Television series by WNET
PBS original programming
2000s American anthology television series